Nati stanchi (a.k.a. Born Tired) is a 2002 Italian comedy film co-written by and starring the comic duo Ficarra e Picone.

Plot 
Salvo and Valentino are two happy Sicilian friends, who do not want to work, because they know that if they find a permanent job, their girlfriends will ask them to marry them. Salvo and Valentino, however, when discover that there is a competition from a librarian in Milan, pretend to prepare for the exam and leave with the trump, encouraging parents and girlfriends. The two hope not to pass the test, and they are very happy, spending the days having fun in the Lombard city, also making very poor figures from the "South". When the two return to Sicily, they discover with great amazement and sadness that they managed to pass the test, because they wrote the test answers at random!

Cast

See also  
 List of Italian films of 2002

References

External links 
 

2002 films
2000s buddy comedy films
Italian buddy comedy films
Films set in Sicily
Films set in Milan
2000s Italian-language films